Field hockey at the 2007 Pan American Games in Rio de Janeiro was held over a ten-day period beginning on July 15 and culminating with the medal finals on July 24 and July 25. All games were played at the Círculo Militar Deodoro. Each team was allowed to enter a maximum of sixteen athletes. The winner of each tournament qualified to compete at the 2008 Summer Olympics in Beijing, China.

Argentina were the reigning Pan American Games champions in both the men's and women's competitions. The men failed to defend their title, losing to Canada 5–4 in a penalty shoot-out in the final. The women defeated the United States 4–2 in the final, winning the tournament for the 6th time.

Medal summary

Medal table

Events

Men's tournament

Qualification

Preliminary round

Pool A

Pool B

Classification round

Fifth to eighth place classification

First to fourth place classification

Final standings

 Qualified for the Summer Olympics

Women's tournament

Qualification

Preliminary round

Pool A

Pool B

Classification round

Fifth to eighth place classification

First to fourth place classification

Final standings

 Qualified for the Summer Olympics

References

 
Pan American Games
2007
Events at the 2007 Pan American Games
2007 Pan American Games